

Gmina Lidzbark is an urban-rural gmina (administrative district) in Działdowo County, Warmian-Masurian Voivodeship, in northern Poland. (This should not be confused with Lidzbark Warmiński, another town in Warmian-Masurian Voivodeship).

The gmina contains parts of the protected areas called Górzno-Lidzbark Landscape Park and Wel Landscape Park.

Villages
Apart from the town of Lidzbark, Gmina Lidzbark contains the villages and settlements of Adamowo, Bełk, Biernaty, Bladowo, Borki, Borówno, Bryńsk, Bryńsk Szlachecki, Bryńsk-Ostrowy, Chełsty, Cibórz, Ciechanówko, Dębowiec, Glinki, Jamielnik, Jeleń, Kiełpiny, Klonowo, Koty, Kurojady, Lidzbark-Nadleśnictwo, Marszewnica, Miłostajki, Nick, Nowe Dłutowo, Nowy Dwór, Nowy Dwór-Leśniczówka, Nowy Zieluń, Olszewo, Ostrowy, Piaseczno, Podcibórz, Sarnia Góra, Słup, Stare Dłutowo, Tarczyny, Wąpiersk, Wawrowo, Wlewsk, Zalesie, Zdrojek and Zielonka.

Neighbouring gminas
Gmina Lidzbark is bordered by the gminas of Bartniczka, Brzozie, Górzno, Grodziczno, Lubowidz, Płośnica and Rybno.

References

Polish official population figures 2006

Lidzbark
Działdowo County